Ebes is a village in Hajdú-Bihar county, in the Northern Great Plain region of eastern Hungary.

Geography

International relations

Twin towns – Sister cities
Ebes is twinned with Meilen, Switzerland

References

Populated places in Hajdú-Bihar County